The 2022 Aurora Borealis Cup playoffs or the 2022 Naisten Liiga playoffs is the playoff tournament of the 2021–22 season of the Naisten Liiga. The tournament began on 26 March and the Aurora Borealis Cup was awarded to Kiekko-Espoo Naiset on 24 April.

Playoff bracket

Quarterfinals
The best-of-five quarterfinals began on 26 March. Games were scheduled to be played on 26, 27, and 31 March, and 2 and 3 April. Home ice advantage was granted to the higher seeded teams for the first, third, and potential fifth games.

(1) Kiekko-Espoo vs. (8) KalPa
Kiekko-Espoo claimed the first seed after winning the regular season title with 2.77 points per game, marking the team’s fourth consecutive regular season victory. After a dismal preliminary series in which they finished with just half a point per game, KalPa went on to win eight of ten games in the lower division series – six in regulation, two in overtime – to secure the eighth seed. The teams last met in the 2020–21 Aurora Borealis Cup finals, the first time in team history KalPa played in the Finnish Championship finals, which Kiekko-Espoo won in four games. They faced one another three times during the 2021–22 preliminaries, all three games resulting in decisive victories for Kiekko-Espoo. 

Game times in Eastern European Time (UTC+02:00)

(2) HIFK vs. (7) HPK
After claiming the 2021 Finnish Championship bronze medal in just their third Naisten Liiga season, HIFK Helsinki continued their incredible upward trajectory to claim the second seed after completing the regular season with 2.69 points per game (78 points in 29 games). They were propelled by the elite production of Matilda Nilsson, the regular season goal scoring champion, who scored 37 goals and 18 assists for 55 points in 29 games; Czech Olympian Michaela Pejzlová, who tallied 42 points from 15 goals and 27 assists despite playing just 21 games; French forward Emmanuelle Passard, who notched 18 goals, 33 points, and an unheard of zero penalty minutes in 28 games; and Finnish Olympian Julia Liikala, who tabbed 15 goals and 33 points in 27 games. 

Finally finding their groove after placing a disappointing seventh in the preliminaries, with only 26 points in 20 games for 1.30 points per game, HPK Hämeenlinna went undefeated in the lower division standings to secure the seventh seed with 3.00 points per game. The team’s change in fortune was due in no small part to the exemplary net minding of newly acquired Canadian goaltender Kassidy Sauvé, who maintained a series leading .964 save percentage and 0.88 goals against average across eight games in the lower division. 

HIFK won both games of the 2021–22 season series with HPK, which were played in the preliminaries. Prior to this matchup, HIFK and HPK had never met in the Naisten Liiga playoffs.

Game times in Eastern European Time (UTC+02:00)

(3) Kärpät vs. (6) Kuortane 

Game times in Eastern European Time (UTC+02:00)

(4) Ilves vs. (5) TPS

Game times in Eastern European Time (UTC+02:00)

Semifinals
The best-of-five semifinals will begin on Wednesday, 6 April and conclude no later than Friday, 15 April.

Kiekko-Espoo vs. TPS
Reigning Finnish Champions Kiekko-Espoo earned placement in the semifinals after defeating eighth-seeded KalPa Kuopio in four quarterfinal games. Elisa Holopainen of Kiekko-Espoo claimed a dominant lead on the playoff scoring tables, notching 8 goals and 13 points in four games to top the charts in both categories, sitting a comfortable three goals and seven points ahead of the second-ranked competitors. Her 5 assists tied with Jonna Yli-Mäenpää of Kärpät for first in the league. Kiekko-Espoo also boasted the highest scoring defenceman in Nelli Laitinen, who scored 3 goals and 3 assists in just two games played. In net, Tiia Pajarinen, the 2021 Aurora Borealis Cup MVP, played three of four games for Kiekko-Espoo and maintained a sublime .946 save percentage, good for third in the league, and a league-leading 1.00 goals against average (GAA).

In the only upset of the quarterfinals, fifth-seed TPS Turku shutout fourth-seed Ilves Tampere in three games to earn the first semifinal berth in team history. Their victory was propelled by the elite scoring of their top-line – centre Estelle Duvin and wingers Maija Otamo and Emmi Metsä-Tokila – each of whom netted 2 goals in the quarterfinals. Duvin tallied 3 assists for 5 points in three games and placed twelfth on the scoring table, while both Otamo and Metsä-Tokila notched 2 assists for 4 points, tying with Oona Havana of Kärpät for sixteenth on the scoring table. Goaltender Mila Houni was a surprise standout for TPS in the quarterfinals, following an unimpressive regular season that culminated in a .892 save percentage and 3.97 goals against average across thirteen games. In the first round of the playoffs, Houni ranked second in the league in save percentage, at .951, and third in goals against average, with 1.33, while playing every minute of the three game series.

Kiekko-Espoo won all four games of the 2021–22 season series with HPK, two of which were played in the preliminaries and two in the regular season.

Kiekko-Espoo and TPS have never met in the Naisten Liiga playoffs prior to this matchup.

Game times in Eastern European Time (UTC+02:00)

HIFK vs. Kärpät
Game times in Eastern European Time (UTC+02:00)

Bronze medal game 
The Aurora Borealis Cup bronze medal was contested in a one-game bronze medal match on Sunday, 17 April. Oulun Kärpät bested TPS in overtime to win their eighth Finnish Championship bronze medal.

Finals 
The best-of-five Finnish Championship finals ( or ) began on 17 April and concluded on 24 April. After coming back from a two-game deficit to push the series to game five, HIFK were unable to overcome the defending champions and Kiekko-Espoo ultimately claimed their sixteenth Finnish Championship title.

Statistics
Scoring leaders

The following players led the league in playoff points at the conclusion of playoffs on 24 April 2022.

Leading goaltenders

The following goaltenders had played at least one playoff match at the conclusion of the playoffs on 24 April 2022, sorted by save percentage.

References

External links
Official statistics from the Finnish Ice Hockey Association 

Naisten Liiga (ice hockey) playoffs